Rogers McVaugh (May 30, 1909 – September 24, 2009) was a research professor of botany and the UNC Herbarium's curator of Mexican plants. He was also Adjunct Research Scientist of the Hunt Institute in Carnegie Mellon University and a Professor Emeritus of botany in the University of Michigan, Ann Arbor.

Education 
Born in New York City, Rogers McVaugh was a brilliant student. He earned the bachelor's degree with highest honors in botany from Swarthmore College in 1931 and a Ph.D in botany from the University of Pennsylvania in 1935.

Career
During his career he held appointments at several universities but spent the majority of his time at the Universities of Michigan (1946 until retirement in 1979) and North Carolina.  He specialised in the Compositae, Myrtaceae, Campanulaceae, woody Rosaceae, and the flora of Mexico, as well as botanical history and nomenclature.

1935-1938: Instructor then Asst. Professor, Botany, University of Georgia, Athens
1938-1946: Associate Botanist, Division of plant exploration & introduction, U.S. Department of Agriculture
1946-1951: Associate Professor, Botany, University of Michigan, Ann Arbor
1951-1974: Professor, Botany, University of Michigan, Ann Arbor
1955-1956: Program Director for Systematic Biology, National Science Foundation, 1974-1979: Harley Harris Bartlett Professor of Botany, University of Michigan, Ann Arbor
1946-1979: Curator of Vascular Plants, University of Michigan Herbarium, Ann Arbor
1972—1975: Director, University of Michigan Herbarium, Ann Arbor
1979–present: Professor Emeritus, Botany, University of Michigan, Ann Arbor
1980–present: Research Professor of Botany, University of North Carolina at Chapel Hill
1981–present: Adjunct Research Scientist, Hunt Institute, Carnegie Mellon University

McVaugh was an expert in the field, especially of neotropical families and collected extensively in western Mexico particularly in the 1930s and 1940s. These are held in several herbaria in the USA, particularly over 23,000 specimens in the Herbarium of the University of Michigan.  Other herbaria with smaller collections include those in University of North Carolina, University of Georgia and University of California.

Publications 

McVaugh published about 12 books and 200 shorter articles in history of botany, floristics and systematic botany. These included:

 (2005) Marcus E. Jones in Mexico, 1892
 (1956) A biography of the 19th-century naturalist Edward Palmer.
 (1935) Recent Changes in the Composition of a Local Flora .

McVaugh's last, partially completed work was the Flora Novo-Galiciana, a multi-volume work focusing on the diverse flora of this region in western Mexico.

Personal life 
McVaugh and Ruth Beall were married in 1937. She died in 1987. They had two children, Michael Rogers McVaugh and Jenifer Beall McVaugh. McVaugh celebrated his 100th birthday in May 2009. He died on September 24, 2009.

Honors
International Association for Plant Taxonomy: Vice-President 1969-1972, President 1972-1975
Festschrift in Taxon, 1979
Botanical Society of America-Merit Award, 1977
Sociedad Botánica de Mexico- Gold Medal 1978
New York Botanical Garden- Henry Allan Gleason award 1984, for Flora Novo-Galiciana vol. 14 (1983)
American Society of Plant Taxonomists—First Annual Asa Gray award, 1984
University of Guadalajara, Mexico— First Luz María Villarreal de Puga Medal, 1993
International Botanical Congress, St. Louis, USA – Millennium Medal, 1999 (one of eight worldwide)
Smithsonian Institution, Washington, D.C. – First Cuatrecasas Medal for Excellence in Tropical Botany, 2001
Botanical Society of America - Centennial Award, 2006

The plant genus Mcvaughia was named in his honor in 1979. The genera Macvaughiella, and Chamguava are also named for him.

The Jardín Botánico Rogers McVaugh public park in San Sebastián del Oeste, Jalisco, Mexico was named in his honor in 2009.

Legacy
The Rogers McVaugh Graduate Student Research Grant Fund was set up within the American Society of Plant Taxonomists in 2004 to provide an annual grant in plant systematics.

References

External links
Malpighiaceae/Mcvaughia

University of Michigan Herbarium

1909 births
2009 deaths
American botanists
American centenarians
Carnegie Mellon University faculty
Men centenarians
Scientists from New York City
Swarthmore College
Swarthmore College alumni
University of Michigan faculty
University of Pennsylvania alumni